The Howland Mill Village Historic District is a historic district roughly bounded by Bolton, Winsper, Hemlock Sts., and Rockdale Avenue in New Bedford, Massachusetts.  It consists of a collection of single-family mill worker housing units constructed in 1888-89 for workers at the nearby Howland Mill, and several double-decker houses built in the 1920s.  The districts uniformity of style is apparent despite some exterior alterations: there are only two basic house plans.  The Howland Mill Company was founded in 1886, and its mills were used in production (under a variety of names and owners) until 1954.  Most of the housing was sold off in the 1910s.

The district was added to the National Register of Historic Places in 1996.

See also
National Register of Historic Places listings in New Bedford, Massachusetts

References

Historic districts in Bristol County, Massachusetts
New Bedford, Massachusetts
National Register of Historic Places in New Bedford, Massachusetts
Historic districts on the National Register of Historic Places in Massachusetts